V. S. Vijay is an Indian politician and was a member of the 14th Tamil Nadu Legislative Assembly from Vellore constituency. He represented the All India Anna Dravida Munnetra Kazhagam party.

Vijay holds an orthopaedics degree and was the Minister for Health in the Government of Tamil Nadu. He had defeated the former MLA, C. Gnanasekaran, who held the Vellore constituency for about 20 years by charan kumar.

The elections of 2016 resulted in his constituency being won by P. Karthikeyan.

References 

Tamil Nadu MLAs 2011–2016
All India Anna Dravida Munnetra Kazhagam politicians
Living people
State cabinet ministers of Tamil Nadu
Year of birth missing (living people)